William Bowman (July 28, 1881 – January 7, 1947) was an American épée and foil fencer. He competed in three events at the 1912 Summer Olympics.  He graduated from Cornell University and Harvard Law School.

References

External links
 

1881 births
1947 deaths
People from Pittston, Pennsylvania
American male épée fencers
Olympic fencers of the United States
Fencers at the 1912 Summer Olympics
Cornell University College of Engineering alumni
Harvard Law School alumni
American male foil fencers